Events in the year 1990 in Brazil.

Incumbents

Federal government
 President: José Sarney (until March 14), Fernando Collor de Mello (starting March 15)
 Vice President: Vacant (until March 14), Itamar Franco (starting March 15)

Governors 
 Acre: Édison Simão Cadaxo
 Alagoas: Moacir Andrade
 Amazonas: Amazonino Mendes (until April 2); Vivaldo Barroso Frota (from April 2)
 Bahia: Nilo Moraes Coelho
 Ceará: Tasso Jereissati
 Espírito Santo: Max Freitas Mauro
 Goiás: Henrique Santillo
 Maranhão: Epitácio Cafeteira (until April 3); João Alberto de Souza (from April 3)
 Mato Grosso: Edison de Oliveira
 Mato Grosso do Sul: Marcelo Miranda Soares
 Minas Gerais: Newton Cardoso
 Pará: Hélio Gueiros 
 Paraíba: Tarcísio Burity
 Paraná: Alvaro Dias 
 Pernambuco: Joaquim Francisco Cavalcanti 
 Piauí: Alberto Silva 
 Rio de Janeiro: Moreira Franco
 Rio Grande do Norte: Geraldo José Ferreira de Melo 
 Rio Grande do Sul: Pedro Simon (until 2 April); Sinval Sebastião Duarte Guazzelli (from 2 April) 
 Rondônia: Jerônimo Garcia de Santana 
 Roraima: Rubens Vilar 
 Santa Catarina: Pedro Ivo Campos (until 27 February); Casildo Maldaner (from 27 February)
 São Paulo: Orestes Quércia 
 Sergipe: Antônio Carlos Valadares
 Tocantins: José Wilson Siqueira Campos

Vice governors
 Acre: Edison Simão Cadaxo (until 2 April); vacant thereafter (from 2 April)
 Alagoas: vacant
 Amazonas: Vivaldo Barros Frota (until 2 April); vacant thereafter (from 2 April)
 Bahia: vacant
 Ceará: Francisco Castelo de Castro 
 Espírito Santo: Carlos Alberto Batista da Cunha 
 Goiás: Joaquim Domingos Roriz 
 Maranhão: João Alberto Souza (until 2 April); vacant thereafter (from 2 April)
 Mato Grosso: Edison Freitas de Oliveira (until 2 April); vacant thereafter (from 2 April)
 Mato Grosso do Sul: George Takimoto 
 Minas Gerais: Júnia Marise de Azeredo Coutinho
 Pará: Hermínio Calvinho Filho 
 Paraíba: vacant
 Paraná: Ary Veloso Queiroz 
 Pernambuco: Carlos Wilson Rocha de Queirós Campos (until 2 April); vacant thereafter (from 2 April)
 Piauí: Lucídio Portela Nunes 
 Rio de Janeiro: Francisco Amaral
 Rio Grande do Norte: Garibaldi Alves 
 Rio Grande do Sul: Sinval Sebastião Duarte Guazzelli (until 2 April); vacant thereafter (from 2 April)
 Rondônia: Orestes Muniz Filho
 Santa Catarina: Casildo João Maldaner (until 2 April); vacant thereafter (from 2 April)
 São Paulo: Almino Afonso (until 2 April); vacant thereafter (from 2 April)
 Sergipe: Benedito de Figueiredo
 Tocantins: Darci Martins Coelho

Events

Births 
 July 3 – Lucas Mendes, footballer

Deaths 
 May 7 – Elizete Cardoso, singer and actress, 69
 July 7 – Cazuza, singer and songwriter, 32 (AIDS)

See also 
1990 in Brazilian football
1990 in Brazilian television

References

 
1990s in Brazil
Years of the 20th century in Brazil
Brazil
Brazil